Ida Bagus Mantra (8 May 1928 – 10 July 1995) was the Governor of Bali from 1978 to 1988.  Ida Bagus Mantra replaced Ida Bagus Oka as governor of Bali. He later served as Indonesia's ambassador to India. He also served as a member of the House of Representatives in 1968.

He died on 10 July 1995, of kidney disease.

External links
Bali World Statesmen
 Ida Bagus Mantra - Pusat Data & Analisi

1928 births
1995 deaths
Governors of Bali
Balinese people
Indonesian Hindus
People from Badung Regency